This is a list of schools in Antigua and Barbuda.

Government schools

Primary schools

Bendals Primary School, Bendals
Bethesda Primary School, Bethesda
Bolans Primary School, Bolans
Buckleys Primary School, Buckleys
Cedar Grove Primary School, Cedar Grove
Cobbs Cross Primary School, Cobbs Cross
Five Islands Primary School, Five Islands
Freemansville Primary School, Freemans
Freetown Primary School, Freetown
Golden Grove Primary School, Golden Grove
Greenbay Primary School, Greenbay
Holy Trinity Primary School, Codrington
Jennings Primary School, Jennings
John Hughes Primary School, John Hughes
J.T. Ambrose Primary School, All Saints
Liberta Primary School, Liberta
Mary E. Pigott Primary School, St. John's
New Winthorpes Primary School, New Winthorpes
Newfield Primary School, Newfield
Old Road Primary School, Old Road
Pares Primary School, Pares
Parham Primary School, Parham
Pigotts Primary School, Pigotts
Potters Primary School, Potters Village
Sea View Farm Primary School, Sea View Farm
T. N. Kirnon Primary School, St. John's
Urlings Primary School, Urlings
Villa Primary School, Villa
Willikies Primary School, Willikies

Secondary schools

All Saints Secondary School, All Saints
Antigua Girls' High School, St. John's
Antigua Grammar School, St. John's
Clare Hall Secondary School, Clare Hall
Glanvilles Secondary School, Glanvilles
Irene B. Williams Secondary School, Swetes
Jennings Secondary School, Jennings
Ottos Comprehensive School, St. John's
Pares Secondary School, Pares
Princess Margaret Secondary School, St. John's
Sir McChesney George Secondary School, Codrington
Sir Novelle Richards Academy, Potters
St. Mary's Secondary School, Bolans

Special schools
Adele School, St. John's
School for the Deaf, (located on the grounds of the T. N. Kirnon Primary School in St. John's)

Private schools

Primary schools
Sunny Side Turtorial School, Paynters
Christian Faith Academy, St. John's
Christian Union Academy, Clare Hall
Foundation Mixed Primary School, St.John's
Goodwill Preparatory School, St. John's
Gospel Light Elementary School, Paynters
Grace Christian Academy, St. John's
Grays Crescent Primary School, Belmont
Greensville Primary School, St. John's
Island Academy International, Buckleys
Kids Unlimited Primary School, Scotts Hill
Minoah Magnet Academy, St. John's
New Bethel SDA Academy, Liberta
Post Millennial Academy, St. John's 
St. Andrews Junior School, St. John's
St. John's Catholic Primary School, St. John's
St. John's Lutheran School, Radio Range
St. John's Temple Primary School, St. John's
St. Michael's Primary School, Cassada Gardens
St. Nicholas Primary School, St. John's
St. Peters Academy, Belmont
Sea View Academic Foundation, Scotts Hill
Seventh Day Adventist School, St. John's
Grace Christian Academy, St. Johns Gambles

Sunnydale Primary School, St. John's
Sunnyside Tutorial Primary School, Paynters
T.O.R. Memorial Primary School, Paynters
Wesleyan Junior Academy, St. John's
Zion Primary School, St. John's

Secondary schools
Christ the King High School, St. John's
Christian Faith Academy, Golden Grove
Island Academy International, Buckleys
Premiere Secondary School, St. John's
St. Joseph Academy, St. John's
Seventh-day Adventist School, St. John's
St. Anthony's Secondary School
Baptist Academy of Antigua, Radio Range
Devine Academy, St. John's
Trinity Academy, Jennings

See also
Education in Antigua and Barbuda
List of universities in Antigua and Barbuda

References

 
Antigua and Barbuda

Schools
Schools
Antigua and Barbuda